Asia Muhammad was the defending champion, but chose to participate at the 2019 Darwin Tennis International instead.

Shelby Rogers won the title, defeating CoCo Vandeweghe in the final, 4–6, 6–2, 6–3.

Seeds

Draw

Finals

Top half

Bottom half

References

Main Draw

Central Coast Pro Tennis Open - Singles